Emilia Nyström (born 13 September 1983) is a professional Finnish beach volleyball player together with her twin sister, Erika. She stands 1.77 m tall and weighs 53 kg. Emilia is the last born of the identical twins and they are both from Muurame, Finland.

References 
 Official Homepage
 AVP Player Bio on Emilia Nyström

1983 births
Living people
Finnish beach volleyball players
Women's beach volleyball players
People from Muurame
Identical twins
Finnish twins
Twin sportspeople
Beach volleyball players at the 2015 European Games
European Games competitors for Finland
Sportspeople from Central Finland